Tribal war and similar phrases can mean:
endemic warfare, the mode of warfare common in tribal societies
TribalWars, an online browser game
Heimosodat, wars around Finland in 1918-1920